Cohors [prima] Hispanorum [quingenaria peditata] pia fidelis ("[1st infantry 500 strong] cohort of Hispani, dutiful and loyal") was a Roman auxiliary infantry regiment. The cohort was stationed in Dacia at castra Largiana.

See also 
 Cohors I Flavia Ulpia Hispanorum miliaria eq c.R.
 List of Roman auxiliary regiments

References
 Academia Română: Istoria Românilor, Vol. 2, Daco-romani, romanici, alogeni, 2nd. Ed., București, 2010, 
 Constantin C. Petolescu: Dacia - Un mileniu de istorie, Ed. Academiei Române, 2010, 
 Petru Ureche: Tactică, strategie și specific de luptă la cohortele equitate din Dacia Romană

Military of ancient Rome
Auxiliary peditata units of ancient Rome
Roman Dacia